Cameron Lake is a lake in Polk County, in the U.S. state of Minnesota.

Cameron Lake was named for Daniel Cameron, a pioneer settler.

See also
List of lakes in Minnesota

References

Lakes of Minnesota
Lakes of Polk County, Minnesota